Jasoi is  a village situated in the  Baghara Mandal of Muzaffarnagar District in Uttar Pradesh, India . It is 8.140 kilometres from the Mandal headquarters at Baghra, and 19.10 kilometres from the district headquarters at Muzaffarnagar.
The village is conquered by Baloch during the rule of Mughal empire [Aurenzeb alamgir] 

The current sarpanch of this village is Mr Zardad ahmed Baloch.

Villages nearby include Gujarheri (1.1 km), Nagala Pithora (1.4 km), Chhetela (1.7 km), Bhamela (2.3 km), Nasirpur (2.5 km), Dholara (2.8 km), and Dholari (3.1 km).

There is a central market in the village and the shops are run by mostly Aggarwal and jangid community.

Being the dominance of Hindus and Muslims communities, the village is very peaceful.there is lord Shiva temple Nageshwar temple the attraction point of this village  

There are various schools in this village: 1.Kisaan Majdoor Inter College 

2.Kasturi Devi Public School

3.Deepak Saraswati Vidya Mandir

4.Indian Public School

5.Montessori School
Etc

References 

Villages in Muzaffarnagar district
Baloch diaspora